Mount Musa may refer to:

Musa Dagh, a mountain near the Gulf of İskenderun in Turkey
 Jebel Musa (Morocco), mountain in northern Morocco, near the Straits of Gibraltar
 Jabal Musa, or Mount Sinai, a mountain in the Sinai Peninsula of Egypt

See also
 Musa (disambiguation)